The United National Liberation Front (UNLF), also known as the United National Liberation Front of Manipur, is a separatist insurgent group active in the state of Manipur in Northeast India which aims at establishing a sovereign and socialist Manipur.

Background
The United Nation Liberation Front's movement manifested as a result of several similar movements of the same political agenda. The outfit was founded on 24 November 1964 with the following key personalities as its central committee members:

 Sana Yaima, Chairman
 Kalalung Kamei, President
 Thankhopao Singsit, Vice-President
 Arambam Samarendra, General Secretary
 Longjam Manimohan, Member
 Laishram Kanhai, Member
 Nongmeikapam Sanajaoba, Member
 Nongmaithem Pahari, Member

Ideology and Aim

The National Investigation Agency (NIA), in September 2012, acknowledged that "the activities carried out by the United National Liberation Front (UNLF) are for bringing sovereignty in the state of Manipur." The UNLF has viewed the statement as "a big political victory."

The UNLF chairperson, R. K. Meghan alias Sanayaima, has been charged for "waging war" against India by the NIA, but the UNLF leader has voiced that the UNLF does not view India or its army as enemies, and "the UNLF only resist the Indian armed forces stationed in Manipur and to resist those people who engaged in colonial repression."

Sana Yaima believes that Manipur is "under martial law," and has questioned the character and worthiness of the elections that had been held in Manipur. He further believes that "the most democratic means to resolve conflict is plebiscite."

Organization
The UNLF is one of the oldest insurgent organizations in Northeast India. E. N. Rammohan, the former Director-General of the Border Security Force, once wrote, "Of the five major (Imphal) valley underground groups, the UNLF's ideology is by and large intact. The senior leadership is well educated and has good organizational control."

Manipur People's Army
Manipur People's Army was formed on 9 February 1987 as an Army Wing of UNLF. In 1991, the UNLF picked up arms, and its first armed action against IOF was carried out on 15 December of 1991 at Lamdan on a CRPF Convoy. In 2005, the MPA's strength was estimated to be about 2,000 armed cadres. According to the UNLF, by 2005, the UNLF was engaged in a battle against about 50,000 armed personnel from the Indian Army deployed against the organisation in the forest regions of Manipur. The cadres of the group are drawn largely from the Meiteis and the Pangals.

The territory inhabited by the Nagas, consisting of four districts of Manipur, is the operating ground of Naga groups such as the NSCNs, who are predominantly Christian. The Imphal valley, consisting of four districts, is the operating ground of Meitei/Pangal groups such as PLA and PREPAK, who predominantly follow Vaishnav Hinduism and Sunni Islam respectively.

Strategy and Tactics
The UNLF is known to be heavily involved with Extortion, Arms Trading, and Income Generating Projects to finance their armed movements. They have several organized training camps within the northeast sector of India and the neighbouring countries of Myanmar and Bangladesh. Ningtam Meira is the primary media outlet they use to make publications.

Four–point proposal to Indian government
The UNLF had put forward four condiciones sine quibus non before the government of India if it is willing to initiate dialogue and ink a peace accord with the organisation, which are:
"A plebiscite under UN supervision to elicit the people's opinion on the core issue of restoration of Manipur's independence."
"Deployment of a UN peacekeeping force in Manipur to ensure free and fair process." 
"Surrender of arms by the UNLF to the UN force, matched by the withdrawal of Indian troops."
"Handing over of political power by the UN in accordance with the results of the plebiscite."

Arrest of chairperson
On 4 December 2010, Sanayaima was produced by the NIA, who claimed to have arrested Sanayaima from Motihari in Bihar; while, Sanayaima has proclaimed that he was abducted by the Bangladeshi agencies on 29 September 2010 and "handed over" to the agencies of India. Sanayaima has been booked by the NIA for "waging war against the Indian Union under section 120 (B) IPC, 121, 121 (A), 122 IPC and 16, 17, 18, 18 (A), 18 (B) & 20 Unlawful Activities Prevention Act, 1967 as amended in 2008." After the arrest, he said that "in a multi-community region, the idea of peace cannot be achieved without considering the collateral damages of the secondary conflict that emerges out of the meaningless peace process."

Drawing inspiration from the "charged political atmosphere" during the "Naxalbari uprising", he had dropped out of the higher studies at the Jadavpur University in Kolkata, and "picked up a gun and vanished into the forest" about 4 decades ago; and had remained underground since then.

Controversies
Civil rights activist Babloo Loitongbom, said that "there was an allegation that certain members of the UNLF had raped 20 women. We formed a multi-ethnic fact finding team to go to the place. Unfortunately, we were not allowed to go inside the camp, we were not given any medical evidence."

See also

 Armed Forces (Special Powers) Act
 Insurgency in Northeast India
 List of terrorist organisations in India

References

External links
 About UNLF in the Global Security Website
 Description of the UNLF in The South Asian Terrorist Portal the international India Jammu organizationsOrganizations

1964 establishments in Assam
Organisations designated as terrorist by India
Organizations based in Asia designated as terrorist
Guerrilla organizations
Insurgency in Northeast India
Islamism in India
Islamic socialism
Jihadist groups in India
Left-wing militant groups in India
Military units and formations established in 1990
National liberation movements
Organisations based in Manipur
Separatism in India
Secessionist organizations in Asia
Volunteer organisations in India